Girls Girls Girls may refer to:

Film
 Girls! Girls! Girls!, 1962 film starring Elvis Presley, named after the Coasters' song (see below)

Music

Albums
 Girls! Girls! Girls! (soundtrack), soundtrack album to the 1962 film
 Girls, Girls, Girls (Mötley Crüe album) (1987)
 Girls Girls Girls (Elvis Costello album), 1989 compilation

Songs
 "Girls Girls Girls" (Fletcher song), 2021
 "Girls, Girls, Girls" (Jay-Z song), 2001
 "Girls, Girls, Girls" (Mötley Crüe song), 1987
 "Girls Girls Girls" (The Coasters song), a single by The Coasters, written by Leiber & Stoller 1961
 "Girls! Girls! Girls!", a song by Emilie Autumn from Fight Like a Girl
 "Girls! Girls! Girls!", a song by Liz Phair from Exile in Guyville
 "Girls, Girls, Girls", a single by Sailor from Trouble (1975)
 "Girls Girls Girls",  a song by Chuck Jackson, written by Smokey Robinson & A. Cleveland Motown 1968
 "Girls Girls Girls", a song by Steve Lawrence, written by Mann & Greenfield 1960
 "Made to Love", a song by the Everly Brothers, covered as "(Girls, Girls, Girls) Made to Love" by Eddie Hodges
 "Girls, Girls, Girls", a song by South Korean boy band Shinee, from the album Dream Girl – The Misconceptions of You